Ooops! is a Canadian children's game show television series which aired on CBC Television from 1970 to 1971.

Premise
Harry Brown, known on the series as the "Great Drake", hosted this game show from various Canadian cities, often with the assistance of local presenters. The set contained a large game board on which contestants moved forward or backward based on the audience response to a given riddle or joke. Game winners chose their prize from six mystery bags, most of which were prizes such as radios, recordings or books, but one bag contained a duck as a booby prize. Children participated in the game by mailing in riddles and jokes to be used for the game segment, and they could also purchase a home version from the CBC.

The series included a parody news and weather segment hosted by John O'Leary entitled "Ooops! Nooos" and "Ooops! Weather For Ducks".

Scheduling
This half-hour series was broadcast on Tuesdays at 5:00 p.m. (Eastern) from 29 September 1970 to 29 June 1971.

References

External links
 

1970 Canadian television series debuts
1971 Canadian television series endings
CBC Television original programming